I'm a Rainbow is the ninth studio album recorded by Donna Summer. The album was recorded in 1981 and scheduled to be released on October 5 but was shelved. It would not be released until fifteen years later on August 20, 1996. There was no official release or promotion for the album. There are also no singles and no music videos from the album. AllMusic gave the album a positive review, naming it her most personal record. 

In 2021, Summer's estate released a reedited version of the album, subtitled Recovered & Recoloured. The new edition is reduced to 10 tracks (15 on vinyl and streaming releases), with each song remixed by contemporary producers and remixers.

Background 
After making her name as the biggest selling and most important female artist of the disco era in the 1970s, Summer had signed to Geffen Records in 1980 and released the new wave-influenced album The Wanderer. I'm a Rainbow, a double album set, was set to be its follow-up (Summer had gained much success during the 1970s with double albums). Donna had just recently given birth to her second child, daughter Brooklyn, when work was to start on the album. Things in the recording studio were not the same as before. As Harold Faltermeyer recalls, "Donna had changed and was going through some things we couldn't help with. Things had changed and scheduled recording sessions were not kept. When Geffen stopped by the studio to check on progress, he was unhappy with what he had heard. There were only a few songs finished and most were in demo phase." He cancelled the project and insisted that Summer part company with Giorgio Moroder and Pete Bellotte, who had produced and co-written, and with whom Summer had been working since the early 1970s. Harold Faltermeyer was unaware that the project had been released in 1996 under the name 'I'm a Rainbow'. "The project was cancelled; I still have the tapes, we never completed the project. There was never any title." She was instead paired up with producer Quincy Jones and begun work on the 1982 self-titled album. This effectively ended Summer's working relationship with the Moroder, Bellotte team, with whom she created 10 critically acclaimed albums.

Over the years, songs from I'm a Rainbow were released on other compilations.
"Highway Runner" appeared on the soundtrack to Fast Times at Ridgemont High in 1982.
"Romeo" appeared on the 1983 Flashdance soundtrack.
The title track (written by Summer's husband Bruce Sudano), and a remix of "Don't Cry for Me Argentina" from Evita on the 1993 compilation album The Donna Summer Anthology.

While dance-oriented music was a theme throughout the album, this was combined with several different musical styles, making it one of Summer's more diverse albums. Styles explored included 80s Brit synthpop like The Human League and Duran Duran, pop/rock, and ballads. It included a duet with Joe "Bean" Esposito, writing credits from Harold Faltermeyer, Keith Forsey, Sylvester Levay, Summer's husband Bruce Sudano as well as the usual Summer/Moroder/Bellotte team.

Bootleg copies of the album circulated among fans for years before the full album was finally released by Mercury Records, a division of Polygram, on 20 August 1996. The original album artwork, however, could not be located, because the project was cancelled and there was no title or artwork made for the cancelled album. The tracks heard on the released album are mostly in demo phase, since the project was shelved, and Harold Faltermeyer insisted only a few tracks were actually finished. As of August 10, 2006 the album has sold 13,000 copies in the United States.

Critical reception for the album was largely positive. As Leo Stanley wrote in AllMusic, "Summer turns in some of her most personal, introspective lyrics and singing, which gives the album an emotional force her albums sometimes lacked. In fact, given the quality of the music, it's hard to see why this was shelved at the time because it is stronger than the majority of her official studio albums."

In 2021, the album was reedited and re-released with the subtitle "Recovered & Recoloured", and it included 10 of the 18 tracks remixed by contemporary remixers and producers. The album opens with the title track, which included a significantly different intro and the addition of a church organ, and closes with Leave Me Alone.

Covers
Several of the shelved songs were licensed to other artists. The Real Thing covered "I Believe in You" late 1981, Anni-Frid Lyngstad of ABBA recorded "To Turn the Stone" (produced by Phil Collins) for her 1982 solo album Something's Going On; it was also included on Joe "Bean" Esposito and Giorgio Moroder's 1983 album Solitary Men. Pianist Helen St. John also covered "Stone" as well as the track "Melanie" under a new name "Images" on her 1982 album, produced by Moroder. Amii Stewart recorded "You to Me" and "Sweet Emotion" for her self-titled album the same year.

Track listing

Notes

References

1996 albums
Donna Summer albums
Albums produced by Pete Bellotte
Albums produced by Giorgio Moroder
Mercury Records albums